The One Main Building, formerly the Merchants and Manufacturers Building (commonly referred to as the M&M Building), is a building on the campus of the University of Houston–Downtown.  The building is recognized as part of the National Register of Historic Places, is a Recorded Texas Historic Landmark, and considered a Contributing Building in Downtown Houston's Main Street/Market Square Historic District.  The building was built above Allen's Landing—an area where Houston's founders John Kirby Allen and Augustus Chapman Allen originally settled.

The Merchants and Manufacturers Building was built in 1930 and was the largest building in the city at the time.  Although the commerce-focused building featured 14 miles of floor space and could accommodate one-third of the city's population, the Great Depression in the United States stifled initial participation.  The building was purchased by South Texas Junior College in the 1960s, which became the University of  College in 1974.

The building remains as the largest facility of the University of Houston–Downtown and was given an official designation as "One Main Building,"  or simply the "Main Building," by the university.

References

External links

University of Houston–Downtown
National Register of Historic Places in Houston
History of Houston
University and college academic buildings in the United States
Art Deco architecture in Texas
Historic district contributing properties in Texas
Buildings and structures completed in 1930
Buildings and structures in Houston
1930 establishments in Texas
Commercial buildings on the National Register of Historic Places in Texas
Recorded Texas Historic Landmarks